Yirrkala chaselingi, known commonly as the chingilt in Australia, is an eel in the family Ophichthidae (worm/snake eels). It was described by Gilbert Percy Whitley in 1940. It is a marine, tropical eel which is known from the western central Pacific Ocean.

References

Ophichthidae
Fish described in 1940